The English Amateur is the national amateur match play golf championship of England. It has been played annually since 1925 (except for war years) and is organised by England Golf.

The English Men's Amateur Championship is contested through two phases. It begins with a 36-hole stroke play competition, with the leading 64 competitors progressing to the knock-out match play competition. Since there are exactly 64 places available in the knock-out stage, countback over the championship course, then back 9, back 6, back 3 and back 1 hole determine tie resolution. All matches in the knock-out phase are played over 18 holes except the final, which is played over 36 holes.

The equivalent stroke play championship is the Brabazon Trophy.

Winners

Source:

Host courses
The English Amateur has been played at the following courses, listed in order of number of times hosted (as of 2020):
7 Woodhall Spa Golf Club
6 Royal St George's Golf Club, Burnham & Berrow Golf Club, Ganton Golf Club, Formby Golf Club
5 Royal Lytham & St Annes Golf Club, Royal Birkdale Golf Club, 
4 Royal Liverpool Golf Club, Saunton Golf Club, Moortown Golf Club, Notts (Hollinwell) Golf Club, Little Aston Golf Club, Hunstanton Golf Club, Walton Heath Golf Club
3 Royal Cinque Ports Golf Club
2 The Berkshire Golf Club, Wentworth Golf Club, Alwoodley Golf Club, Frilford Heath Golf Club
1 Hillside Golf Club, Rye Golf Club, Littlestone Golf Club, Silloth-on-Solway Golf Club, Royal Mid-Surrey Golf Club, Seascale Golf Club, St. Mellion, Woburn Golf Club, Northumberland Golf Club, Sutton Coldfield Golf Club, North Hants Golf Club, Hankley Common Golf Club, Gosforth Park Golf Club, Scarborough South Cliff Golf Club, Hesketh Golf Club, Bromborough Golf Club.

References

External links
England Golf

Amateur golf tournaments in the United Kingdom
Golf tournaments in England
1925 establishments in England
Recurring sporting events established in 1925